"Paralyzed" is a song by American rapper and singer Sueco. It was released on August 13, 2021, via Atlantic Records. Due to Internet memes on TikTok, the song  has garnered over 30 million streams, and reached number one on the Spotify US 50 Viral chart.  The song appears on Sueco's studio album It Was Fun While It Lasted.

Music video
The music video was released on September 10, 2021, and directed by Alex Bittan, who also shoots for Panic! at the Disco, Paramore and Twenty One Pilots. It describes a story about a girl "goes to a Sueco show", it holds a "drag race scene from Grease", and the girl "runs into someone who has supposedly emotionally abused her, and she eventually gives in to the music, getting over this person by crowd-surfing at the Sueco show."

Chart performance
It reached number 65 on the US Billboard Hot 100 and number eight on the Billboard Hot Rock & Alternative Songs chart, becoming Sueco's first and highest entry.

Credits and personnel
Credits adapted from Tidal.

 Colin Brittain – producer, mixer, writer
 Dwilly – producer
 John Feldmann – producer, writer
 No Love For The Middle Child – producer
 Michelle Mancini – Mastering
 Andrew Migliore – writer
 David Wilson – writer
 William Henry Schultz – writer

Charts

Weekly charts

Year-end charts

Certifications and sales

Release history

References

2021 songs
2021 singles
Songs written by Colin Brittain
Songs written by John Feldmann
Song recordings produced by Colin Brittain
Atlantic Records singles
American pop punk songs
Emo rap songs